Zeiraphera ratzeburgiana, the spruce bud moth or Ratzeburg tortricid, is a moth of the family Tortricidae. It is found from northern and central Europe to eastern Russia and China (Gansu, Qinghai). Zeiraphera ratzeburgiana is a taxonomically similar species to Zeiraphera canadensis and can only be distinguished by an anal comb found in Z. canadensis.

The wingspan is 12–15 mm. Adults are on wing in July and August.

The larvae mainly feed on Picea abies, but has also been recorded on Picea sitchensis, Picea smithiana, Pinus sylvestris, Pinus pinea and Abies cephalonica. The larvae penetrate into the buds of the host plant and feed on the needles and eventually on the growing point. Malformation of the bud causes the young shoot to bend which severely damages the growing point. Larvae can also attack the female blossom and damage the young cone.

References

External links
Eurasian Tortricidae
bladmineerders.nl

Eucosmini
Moths described in 1840
Moths of Japan
Moths of Europe